Doris Fisher may refer to:

Doris Fisher (songwriter) (1915–2003), United States singer and songwriter
Doris Fisher, Baroness Fisher of Rednal (1919–2005), British life peer and politician
Doris F. Fisher (born 1931), founder of The Gap, Inc.